The 1979–80 John Player Cup was the ninth edition of England's premier rugby union club competition at the time. Leicester won the competition for the second consecutive year defeating London Irish in the final. The attendance of 27,000 was a record. The event was sponsored by John Player cigarettes and the final was held at Twickenham Stadium.

Draw and results

First round
				
Progressed as away team*

Second round

Quarter-finals

Semi-finals

Progressed as away team*

Final

References

1979–80 rugby union tournaments for clubs
1979–80 in English rugby union
RFU Knockout Cup